The Electoral Commission of Queensland (ECQ) is established under the Electoral Act 1992 as an independent statutory authority, responsible for the impartial conduct of state and local government elections in Queensland.

Functions
The Commission has three main functions.  It must administer Queensland's electoral laws, conduct democratic parliamentary and industrial elections which are free and review local government boundaries. It is also responsible for referendums, electoral redistributions, education and research into matters related to Queensland elections, providing information to all levels of government, ensuring the electoral roll is maintained and the registering of political parties.

Electronic voting
In 2010, the Commission announced it was conducting research into assisting the deaf and blind to cast a secret vote electronically. However, due to legislative restrictions, electronic voting was not available for the 2012 state election.

See also

Australian Electoral Commission
Court of Disputed Returns
Electoral districts of Queensland
Politics of Queensland

References

External links

Elections in Queensland
Government agencies of Queensland
1992 establishments in Australia
Government agencies established in 1992
Queensland